Charles Brian Mitchell (born 16 July 1963) is a Scottish former professional footballer who played in both Scotland and England, making over 250 league appearances for four teams.

Life and career
Mitchell was born in Stonehaven, Aberdeenshire. He began his football career with King Street Belmont before signing professional forms with Aberdeen in 1981. He stayed with Aberdeen until 1987, and made 65 league appearances. Mitchell signed with Bradford City in February 1987, and in a spell of a little over five years, made 178 league appearances. After leaving Bradford in 1992, he enjoyed one season spells with both Bristol City and Hull City, before retiring in 1994. He then returned to the Aberdeen area where he worked in sports development for the local council.

References

External links 

1963 births
Living people
People from Stonehaven
Footballers from Aberdeenshire
Scottish footballers
Association football fullbacks
Aberdeen F.C. players
Bradford City A.F.C. players
Bristol City F.C. players
Hull City A.F.C. players
Scottish Football League players
English Football League players